Tan Sri Datuk Amar Chong Siew Fai (born 4 January 1935) was a Malaysian barrister and judge who served as the second Chief Judge of Sabah and Sarawak.

Early life and education 
Chong was born in Sarikei in the then-British protectorate state of Raj of Sarawak to a couple who were owners of a Chinese drugstore. The oldest of seven siblings, he completed his high school education at St. Anthony's National Secondary School in his hometown and later also attended St. Joseph's National Secondary School in Kuching. After his father had fallen ill, Chong returned home to take over the helm at the family business after having only completed Form 3 (Year 10) of his high school. Nevertheless, he self-studied and eventually took teaching jobs at his alma mater, St. Anthony's, including teaching Form 4 and 5 (Years 11 and 12) morning classes between 1952 and 1962.

On 27 September 1962, Chong, aged 27, used his savings from his teaching days to pay for his ship ticket to London, United Kingdom to begin his studies after being accepted into Lincoln's Inn. Working tirelessly, he finished his studies in 18 months compared to the usual three years. Upon completion of his studies and admission to the English Bar in February 1965, Chong would return home to practice and eventually founded the law firm "Chong Brothers Advocates" in 1968 alongside his younger brother, Chong Siew Chiang.

Career

Advocates’ Association of Sarawak 
In May 1965, he was called to the Advocates’ Association of Sarawak (Sarawak Bar) and practised law at "Messrs. Yong & Co." until December 1967. After around seven years since the foundation of his legal firm, Chong was elected President of the Advocates’ Association of Sarawak. He held this position between 1975 and 1979. During this time, he was appointed Commissioner for Oaths (August 1978) and later Notary public (October 1978).

Judicial 
Immediately after his tenure ended, Chong was appointed a judge of the High Court of Malaysia. For the following 14 years, he would serve in this capacity at various cities around the country where the High Courts were found, including Kuching, Kota Kinabalu and Sibu. In 1994, Chong was elevated to serve in the Federal Court of Malaysia, the apex court in Malaysia. Shortly after his promotion, Chong was appointed as the new Chief Judge of Sabah and Sarawak in 1995, thus ascending to the nation's fourth highest judicial office after the Chief Justice of Malaysia, President of the Court of Appeal of Malaysia and Chief Judge of Malaya. Simultaneously, he was also appointed a judge of the Special Court of Malaysia. He served in this office between June 1995 and July 2000 before retiring.

Other positions 
 Chairman of Ku Seng Association, Sarawak (January 1975 to January 1980)
 Vice Chairman of the Hakka Association, Kuching (January 1979 to January 1980)
 Deputy Secretary-General of the Federation of the 1st Division Chinese Associations, Sarawak (November 1979 to January 1980)

Honours 
  :
  Commander of the Order of Loyalty to the Crown of Malaysia (PSM) - Tan Sri (1999)
  :
  Knight Commander of the Order of the Star of Sarawak (PNBS) - Dato Sri
  Knight Commander of the Order of the Star of Hornbill Sarawak (DA) - Datuk Amar (1999)

Personal life 
Chong was a Malaysian Chinese of Hakka descent. He was married to Puan Sri Datin Amar Rosalind T'en Yaw Hee on 2 October 1968, together, they have one son and three daughters. Chong's nephew and son of Chong Siew Chiang, Chong Chieng Jen, is the current Deputy Minister of Domestic Trade and Consumer Affairs of Malaysia and Member of Parliament (MP) for Stampin.

 Chairman of Matrix International Berhad (January 2003 to January 2006)

Death 
Chong died on 23 January 2006 at his home in Kuching having suffered from colon cancer for the previous 18 months.

References 

1935 births
2006 deaths
People from Sarawak
20th-century Malaysian judges
Malaysian people of Chinese descent
Malaysian people of Hakka descent
Hakka people
Knights Commander of the Most Exalted Order of the Star of Sarawak
Knights Commander of the Order of the Star of Hornbill Sarawak
Commanders of the Order of Loyalty to the Crown of Malaysia
Members of Lincoln's Inn
Deaths from cancer in Malaysia
Deaths from colorectal cancer